is an electoral district of the Japanese House of Representatives. The district was created as part of the 2022 reapprotionments that gave Tokyo 5 new districts, and it will elect its first member in the 2025 general election.

Areas Covered

Current District 
As of the 11 January 2023, the areas covered by this district are as follows:

 Eastern section of Nerima 
 Asahigaoka 1-2, Kotake 1-2, Sakae-Machi, Hazawa 1-3, Toyotama-Kami 1-2, Toyotama-Naka 1-4, Toyotama-Minami 1-3, Toyotama-Kita 1-6, Nakamura 1-3, Nakamuraminami 1-3, Nakamurakita 1-4, Sakuradai 1-6, Nerima 1-4, Mukaiyama 1-4, Nukui 1-3, Nukui 4 (28th, 29th 4, 8-22, 30th 9, 10, 44-46, 47th 18-48, 50-52 excluded), Nukui 5, Nishiki 1-2, Hikawadai 1-4, Heiwadai 1-4, Hayamiya 1-4, Kasugacho 1-6, Takamatsu 1-5 , Kitamachi 1-8 , Tagara 1-5, Hikarigaoka 1-7, Asahi 1-3, Fujimidai 3 (excluding 20-6-10, 38-46, 47-5-7, 55-6-17, 56-63), Yahara 1

before the creation of this district, the eastern parts of Nerima were split between the 9th and 10th districts.

Elected Representatives

Election Results

References 

Nerima
Constituencies established in 2022
House of Representatives (Japan)
Districts of Tokyo